Bush Hill Park is a London Overground station on the  branch of the Lea Valley lines, serving the neighbourhood of Bush Hill Park in the London Borough of Enfield, north London.

Its three-letter station code is BHK and it is in Travelcard zone 5. In 2015 the line and Bush Hill Park transferred from Abellio Greater Anglia operation to become part of the London Overground network, and it was added to the Tube map.

History
The station was opened by the Great Eastern Railway in 1880 following housing development plans arranged by the North London Estates Company. Development in the area expanded after the railway station was opened.

Services
The typical off-peak service (including Sundays) is two trains per hour to Enfield Town and two trains per hour to London Liverpool Street.

During morning and evening peak times, service frequency is increased, typically to four trains per hour in each direction.

Connections
London Buses routes 192, 217, 231, 377 and school route 617 serve the station.

References

External links

Railway stations in the London Borough of Enfield
Enfield, London
Former Great Eastern Railway stations
Railway stations in Great Britain opened in 1880
Railway stations served by London Overground